Catch Kandy was an Australian children's drama television series produced by Australian Film Productions. It was shot on film in colour on location in Sydney, Australia, premiering on the Seven Network in Australia on 12 May 1973 and ran for 13 episodes. The series was later shown in the United Kingdom, South Africa, Canada, Malaysia, Hong Kong, New Zealand, Singapore and Zimbabwe.

Plot overview
The series tells the story of an orphaned boy Catch Kandy and his sister Kate Kandy who, as the series begins, are living with their uncle, Earle Kandy. Their uncle, however, slips on a roller-skate which Catch left lying near stairs, and knocks himself unconscious. Believing he has killed his uncle, Catch and his sister go on the run. They end up hiding out at the Taronga Park Zoo in Sydney, living in a cave within the bear sanctuary whilst their uncle tries to track them down. They befriend a zoologist called Christian Faber.

Episode list

 The Runaways
 Into The Net
 Christian Faber
 Enemy Country
 The Bait
 Follow The Band
 Young Fugitive
 Close Call
 The Price
 Capsize
 Climb Into Trouble
 Man In A Wetsuit
 Gone Astray

Cast list
 Jann Ramel - Catch Kandy
 Jacqueline Foley - Kate Kandy
 Patrick Ward - Christian Faber (pilot)
 Shane Porteous - Christian Faber
 Peter Reynolds - Earle Kandy 
 Carmen Duncan - Mrs Wayne
 Lyn James - 2nd Mrs Wayne
 Zac Martin - Munganye
 Colin Hughes - police sergeant Lawson
 Bob Lee - policeman
 Darrel Martin - zoo kiosk attendant
 Graeme Smith - Slow Kelly
 Barry Donnelly - Fox Reagon

References

External links
 
 OzTV Credits
 Classic Australian Television Chronology
 

Australian drama television series
Seven Network original programming
Television shows set in New South Wales
1973 Australian television series debuts
1973 Australian television series endings
Australian children's television series